La Chapelle-de-Brain is a commune in the Ille-et-Vilaine department in Brittany in northwestern France.

Population
Inhabitants of La Chapelle-de-Brain are called branichapellois in French.

Gallery

See also
Communes of the Ille-et-Vilaine department

References

External links

La Chapelle de Brain 

Mayors of Ille-et-Vilaine Association 

Communes of Ille-et-Vilaine